The 1931 Daniel Baker Hillbillies football team represented Daniel Baker College as a member of the Texas Intercollegiate Athletic Association (TIAA) during the 1931 college football season. Led by third–year head coach R. E. Blair, the Hillbillies compiled an overall record of 4–5 with a mark of 3–2 in conference play, winning the TIAA's Western Division title. Daniel Baker advanced to the TIAA Championship Game, where the Hillbillies lost to North Texas State.

Schedule

References

Daniel Baker
Daniel Baker Hillbillies football seasons
Daniel Baker Hillbillies football